The 2020–21 Campeonato de Portugal was the eighth season of Portuguese football's renovated third-tier league, since the merging of the Segunda Divisão and Terceira Divisão in 2013, and the sixth season under the current Campeonato de Portugal title. A total of 96 teams competed in this division.

Due to the cancellation of all non-professional competitions in the country due to the COVID-19 pandemic in Portugal on the previous season, no teams were relegated, which lead to an additional team from each of the 20 district championships. The Portuguese Football Federation decided the creation of the Liga 3, a new tier in the Portuguese league system, beginning with the 2021–22 season, as well as a new format for Campeonato de Portugal, including the addition of four reserve teams invited from Primeira Liga clubs raising the total number of teams from 72 to 96. This new format will reduce the total number of teams to 56 on the next season.

Format
The new competition format consists of three stages. In the first stage, the 96 clubs were divided in eight series of 12 teams, according to geographic criteria, with a maximum of two reserve teams in each series. In each series, teams played against each other in a home-and-away double round-robin system.

In the second stage, the best-placed teams of each of eight Series advanced to the promotion series, teams placed from second to fifth qualified for Liga 3 qualification Series, bottom 4 teams were relegated to the District Championships and remaining teams stayed in Campeonato de Portugal. On the promotion series, the 8 teams were divided in two series of 4 teams, the winners of each series being promoted to LigaPro, remaining teams qualified for Liga 3. On the Liga 3 qualification Series, the 32 teams were divided in eight series of 4 teams, the two best-placed teams of each series qualified for Liga 3. In both promotion Series and Liga 3 qualification Series, teams played against each other in a home-and-away double round-robin system.

In the third stage, the best-placed teams of the two promotion series faced each other on a neutral venue to decide the champion.

Teams

Relegated from 2019–20 Primeira Liga:
 Cova da Piedade Vitória de Setúbal
 Casa Pia Desportivo das Aves

From Serie A:

Fafe
Vitória SC B
Braga B
Merelinense
São Martinho
Maria da Fonte
Marítimo B
Montalegre
Berço
Chaves Satélite
Mirandela
União da Madeira
Pedras Salgadas
Cerveira
Bragança
AD Oliveirense
Câmara de Lobos

From Serie B:

Lusitânia Lourosa
Sp. Espinho
Leça
Castro Daire
Sanjoanense
Felgueiras
Paredes
Canelas 2010
Amarante
Coimbrões
Trofense
Pedras Rubras
Gondomar
Lusitano Vildemoinhos
Valadares Gaia
Vila Real
Ginásio Figueirense

From Serie C:

Praiense
Benfica Castelo Branco
Anadia
Sertanense
Fátima
Beira-Mar
Caldas
Condeixa
Torreense
Oleiros
Marinhense
União de Leiria
Águeda
Oliveira do Hospital
União de Santarém
Sp. Ideal
Vitória de Sernache
Fontinhas

From Serie D:

Olhanense
Real
Alverca
Louletano
Sintrense
Pinhalnovense
Loures
Oriental
1.º de Dezembro
Amora
Esperança de Lagos
Armacenenses
Olímpico Montijo
Sacavenense
Lusitano de Évora
Fabril Barreiro
Aljustrelense
Sintra Football Estrela da Amadora

Promoted from 2019 to 2020 District Championships: 

 Algarve FA: Moncarapachense
 Aveiro FA: São João de Ver
 Azores Champ.: Rabo de Peixe
 Beja FA: Moura
 Braga FA: Pevidém, Brito and  Vilaverdense
 Bragança FA: Águia Vimioso 
 Castelo Branco FA: Alcains
 Coimbra FA: Carapinheirense
 Évora FA: Juventude de Évora
 Guarda FA: Sp. Mêda Vila Cortês
 Leiria FA: GRAP
 Lisboa FA: Pêro Pinheiro and Lourinhanense
 Madeira FA: Camacha
 Portalegre FA: Crato
 Porto FA: Salgueiros and Tirsense
 Santarém FA: União Almeirim
 Setúbal FA: Oriental Dragon
 Viana do Castelo FA: Vianense
 Vila Real FA: Mondinense and Vidago
 Viseu FA: Mortágua

Invited reserve teams:
 Sporting B
 Rio Ave B
 Belenenses SAD B

Notes

First stage

The first stage schedule was drawn on 4 September 2020 and were played from 20 September 2020 to 3 April 2021.

Serie A

Serie B

Serie C

Serie D

Serie E

Serie F

Serie G

Serie H

Second stage
Both promotion series and Terceira Liga qualification series were played from 18 April 2021 to 22 May 2021.

Promotion series

North Serie

South Serie

Liga 3 qualification Series

Serie 1

Serie 2

Serie 3

Serie 4

Serie 5

Serie 6

Serie 7

Serie 8

Final

References

Campeonato Nacional de Seniores seasons
3
Por